The 37th edition of the annual Vuelta a Venezuela was held from October 17 to October 29, 2000. The stage race started in San Fernando, and ended in San Cristóbal.

Stages

2000-10-17: San Fernando — San Fernando (129 km)

2000-10-18: Calabozo — San Juan de Los Morros (154 km)

2000-10-19: El Cabriales — Valencia (110 km)

2000-10-20: Yagua — San Diego (22 km)

2000-10-20: Valencia — Valencia (94 km)

2000-10-21: Valencia — Los Teques (133 km)

2000-10-22: Bolívar — Caracas (130 km)

2000-10-23: Maracay — San Felipe (169 km)

2000-10-24: San Felipe Circuito (83 km)

2000-10-24: Barquisimeto Circuit (63 km)

2000-10-25: Carora — Cabimas (201 km)

2000-10-26: Cabimas — Dividive (157 km)

2000-10-27: Dividive — El Vigía (160 km)

2000-10-28: El Vigía — San Cristóbal (175 km)

2000-10-29: San Cristóbal Circuito (124 km)

Final classification

References 
 http://www.geocities.com/alguerdu/CICL/vvenezuela.htm Results (Archived 2009-10-22)

Vuelta a Venezuela
Venezuela
Vuelta Venezuela